What's Not to Love? is the fifth studio album by British band The Nightingales. The mini-album was recorded  in January 2007 in Birmingham.  Along with five original songs, the album contains a cover version of the Murray Wecht composition "Drummer Man", originally recorded by Nancy Sinatra.

Track listing 
 "Plenty of Spare" – 4:52
 "Eleven Fingers" – 2:24
 "Bang Out of Order" – 5:18
 "Drummer Man" – 3:33
 "Overreactor" – 3:02
 "Wot No Blog?" – 4:03

Reception 
Dave Hoffman of PopMatters rated the album 4/10 stars and called it "completely forgettable".
Jennifer Kelly of Dusted Magazine was more positive writing All six songs are killers and It's too complicated to be punk, too hard and fast to be anything else...maybe it's time for the Nightingales to invent their own genre.

References

External links 
Official artist website

2007 albums
The Nightingales albums
Alternative rock albums by British artists